The Zweikofel Formation is a geologic formation in Austria. It preserves fossils dating back to the Permian period.

See also

 List of fossiliferous stratigraphic units in Austria

References
 

Permian Austria